Bill Storer (born 7 February 1942) is a former Australian rules footballer who played with Fitzroy in the Victorian Football League (VFL).

References

External links
		

Living people
1942 births
Australian rules footballers from Victoria (Australia)
Fitzroy Football Club players